Entemnotrochus adansonianus, common name Adanson's slit shell, is a species of sea snail, a marine gastropod mollusk in the family Pleurotomariidae.

Subspecies
 Entemnotrochus adansonianus adansonianus (Crosse & Fischer, 1861)
 Entemnotrochus adansonianus bermudensis Okutani & Goto, 1983

Description
  
The length of the shell varies between 80 mm and 190 mm.  This attractive species has a pale yellowish-fleshy color with numerous, irregular, reddish spots, sometimes vivid, sometimes more or less effaced. The shell has a trochiform shape above, but is plano-convex beneath and concave in the middle.  It is concentrically costate-sulcate with granulose ribs. It has many longitudinal wrinkles.  The acuminate apex is smooth and yellowish. The 11 whorls increase slowly and are rather planulate at the sutures. The shell is unequally divided by the slit fasciole. Below it is traversed by 7 to 8 spiral granose ribs, above it with longitudinal, oblique, rather separated striae and two spiral, slightly marked series of granules; The body whorl is obtusely bicarinate. The slit fascicle has a semicircular, delicate, impressed stride. It has a round and very deep, pervious umbilicus. The species has a (thin yellow in juvenile examples) operculum that completely seals the subquadrate aperture. The shell is pearly within.

Distribution
E. adansonianus is endemic to the West Indies and Caribbean region. A very few of these rare slit shells that reside at depths between 150–240 metres have been dredged and (crabbed examples) trapped. This species also occurs on the Mid-Atlantic Ridge.

References

 Crosse, H. & Fischer, P., 1861. Observation sur le genre Pleurotomaire, et description d'une deuxième espèce vivante appartenant au même genre. Journal de Conchyliologie 9: 155–167
 Fischer-Piette, E., 1950. Listes des types décrits dans le Journal de Conchyliologie et conservés dans la collection de ce journal. Journal de Conchyliologie 90: 8–23
 F. R. Woodward, 1989. Samuel Archer and  Entemnotrochus adansoniana (formerly Pleurotomaria adansoniana). Proceedings of the Birmingham Natural History Society 26 (1): 25–28 [supplement to Woodward, 1963]. 
 Turgeon, D.D., et al. 1998. Common and scientific names of aquatic invertebrates of the United States and Canada. American Fisheries Society Special Publication 26 page(s): 57
 Williams S.T., Karube S. & Ozawa T. (2008) Molecular systematics of Vetigastropoda: Trochidae, Turbinidae and Trochoidea redefined. Zoologica Scripta 37: 483–506
 Rosenberg, G., F. Moretzsohn, and E. F. García. 2009. Gastropoda (Mollusca) of the Gulf of Mexico, Pp. 579–699 in Felder, D.L. and D.K. Camp (eds.), Gulf of Mexico–Origins, Waters, and Biota. Biodiversity. Texas A&M Press, College Station, Texas.

External links
 
 MNHN, Paris: holotype

Pleurotomariidae
Gastropods described in 1861